Carola Lamberti – Eine vom Zirkus is an East German drama film directed by Hans Müller. It was released in 1954.

Cast
 Henny Porten as Carola Lamberti
 Horst Naumann as Camillo Lamberti
 Rüdiger Renn as Eduard Lamberti (as Hans-Rüdiger Renn)
 Edwin Marian as Pero Lamberti
 Ursula Kempert as Viola
 Catja Görna as Ines Lamberti
 Johannes Arpe as Stegemann
 Hans Klering as Borbasch
 Herbert Richter as Mollenkamp
 Herbert Kiper as Willem
 Fritz Schlegel as Möckwitz
 Jürgen Krumwiede as Meschik

External links
 

1954 films
1954 drama films
German drama films
East German films
1950s German-language films
German black-and-white films
1950s German films